Swamir Aadesh ( Husband's order) is a 1998 Bengali drama film directed by Swapan Saha. The film's music is composed by Anupam Dutta.

Cast
 Prosenjit Chatterjee
 Abhishek Chatterjee
 Biplab Chatterjee
 Satabdi Roy
 Anushree Das
 Mrinal Mukherjee

Soundtrack 
"Amar Ei Monete" - Kumar Sanu, Sasha Ghoshal
"Chaina Toh Beshi Kichhu" - Kumar Sanu, Sasha Ghoshal 
"Chokhe Chokhe Rakhi" - Kumar Sanu, Sasha Ghoshal 
"Uthuk Jotoi Jhor" - Kumar Sanu
"Amar Ei Gaan" - Sasha Ghoshal

Release

References

External links
 Swamir Aadesh at the Gomolo

1998 drama films
1998 films
Bengali-language Indian films
Films directed by Swapan Saha
Films scored by Anupam Dutta
1990s Bengali-language films
Indian drama films